Sopa de pata is a hearty Salvadoran soup made from cow's feet, tripe, yuca (also called cassava or manioc), cabbage leaves, chayotes, sweet corn, plantains, and green beans. It may be seasoned with Mexican coriander leaves and flavored to taste with lemon or chile powder.

Salvadoran cuisine
Soups
Offal